Saint Peter is a civil parish of Antigua and Barbuda, located on northeastern Antigua island. It had a population of 5,325 in 2011.

Populated places
The parish contains the city of Parham. Other populated places include:

 All Saints (Saint Peter portion)
 Big Duers
 Cedar Hill
 Cochranes
 Cocoa Hall (Mercers Creek Division)
 Crabs Mill
 Diamonds
 Freemans
 Gilberts (Mercers Creek Division)
 Jonas (All Saints)
 Mount Joy
Pares
Parham Hill
 Parrys
 Sandersons
 The Garden
 Twenty Hill
 Vernons
 Yeamans

Guiana Island and Great Bird Island are within the parish.

The parish is home to Betty's Hope Sugar Plantation, a popular historic site.

Demographics (2011)

References

 
Parishes of Antigua and Barbuda
Antigua (island)